Worlds Collide is the sixth studio album from Finnish classical band, Apocalyptica. While this album is the sixth major release, it is also (including singles, videos, box sets, etc.) the twenty-eighth release overall.

Track listing

Japanese edition DVD
 "Grace" (music video)
 "I Don't Care" (music video)
 "S.O.S. (Anything But Love)" (music video)
 "I'm Not Jesus" (music video)
 "I'm Not Jesus" (making of)
 "Interview"
 "Interview in Japan"
 "Master of Puppets" (live)
 "Betrayal" (live)
 "Photo Gallery"
source:

Reception

Certifications

Release history

Personnel
Apocalyptica
Eicca Toppinen – rhythm cello (1, 3 , 4, 6–12 & 14)
Perttu Kivilaakso – bass cello (3 & 13)
Paavo Lötjönen – lead cello (3 & "Dreamer")
Mikko Sirén – drums (1–6 & 8–14) (2, 3 & 7)

Musical guests and technical staff

"I'm Not Jesus"
Corey Taylor – vocals
Pain – remix
Rich Costey – mixing, also on "I Don't Care"

Songwriters
Johnny Andrews – also on "S.O.S (Anything but Love)"
Geno Lenardo

"S.O.S (Anything but Love)"
Cristina Scabbia – lead vocals
Mats Levén – backing vocals

"Helden"
Till Lindemann – vocals 
Richard Kruspe – electric guitar
 David Bowie – songwriter
 Brian Eno – songwriter

"I Don't Care"
 Adam Gontier – vocals, songwriter
 Max Martin – songwriter
Paul Bushnell – bass
Howard Benson – keyboards, programming, Hammond B3, Korg Trinity, piano, electric piano, Fender rhodes, farfisa, sequencing
Paul Decarli – digital editing
Hatsukazu Inagaki – engineering 
Mike Plotnikoff – recording

Guitar staff
Phil X – electric guitar
Marc Vangool – guitar technician

Other guests
Tomoyasu Hotei – guitar and music on "Grace"
Dave Lombardo – drums on "Last Hope"

Album inlay
 Ville Akseli – photography
 Takehiko Maeda – Japanese liner notes

Other technical staff
 Stefan Glaumann – mixing
 Justin Gerrish – mix assisting
 Svante Forsback – mastering (1–4, 6, 7, 12 & 13) 
 Ted Jensen – mastering  (5, 8–11)
Henka Johansson – drum technician
Ulf Kruckenberg – drum recording

References

Apocalyptica albums
2007 albums
Sony BMG albums
Classical albums